Jonas Cornelius Falk (1844–1915) was a Norwegian politician for the Liberal Party.

He served as a deputy representative to the Parliament of Norway during the term 1898–1900, representing the constituency of Nordlands Amt. He worked as a telegraph manager. He lived in Hemnesberget, was married to Anna Margrethe Middelthon (1857–1924) and is otherwise known as the father of politician and ideologist Erling Falk.

References

1844 births
1915 deaths
Liberal Party (Norway) politicians
Deputy members of the Storting
Nordland politicians